Code page 773 (also known as CP 773) is a code page used under DOS to write the Estonian, Lithuanian and Latvian languages. 

It is closely related to both code page 775 (used for the same languages) and the KBL encoding for Lithuanian. It retains the full set of box-drawing characters from code page 437 (except for the half blocks), whereas code page 775 only retains the code page 850 set. It does this by encoding the Lithuanian letters at their KBL locations rather than their code page 775 locations, which replaces half blocks and punctuation. Therefore it includes all letters (but not all characters) of ISO 8859-13.

Character set
The following table shows code page 773. Each character is shown with its equivalent Unicode code point. Only the second half of the table (code points 128–255) is shown, the first half (code points 0–127) being the same as code page 437.

References

773